The Loy Kirksey House is a historic house in rural Clark County, Arkansas.  It is located on the south side of Still Creek Road (County Road 59) east of the hamlet of Fendley.  This single-story dog trot house was built in stages, beginning with a single log pen that probably predates the American Civil War.  Around 1895 this structure was expanded to form the dog-trot by William Kirksey.  The only significant alteration since then is the replacement of the original chimney in the mid-20th century with the present brick one.  The property also includes two single-story log barns built in the early decades of the 20th century.

The house was listed on the National Register of Historic Places in 1992.

See also
National Register of Historic Places listings in Clark County, Arkansas

References

Houses on the National Register of Historic Places in Arkansas
Houses completed in 1895
Houses in Clark County, Arkansas
National Register of Historic Places in Clark County, Arkansas